Hiemstra is a surname. Notable people with the surname include:

Edmée Hiemstra (born 1970), Dutch water polo athlete
Femke Hiemstra (born 1974), Dutch painter
Johann Hiemstra (born 1949), South African entrepreneur 
Klaske Hiemstra (born 1954), Dutch writer
Rudolph Hiemstra (1912–2007), South African Air Force General